Image Diffusion International (IDI) is a Quebec production company founded by Anne-Marie Losique and Marc Trudeau in 1995. Based in Montreal, it specializes in producing entertainment and lifestyle television magazines. Its shows are sometimes Quebec-based in French and sometimes edited in two versions, French and English. Some of their programmes are shot in the studios of MusiquePlus, a music television station on which many IDI shows are aired. IDI's productions are broadcast on multiple networks across Quebec and Canada. Its show Sex-shop was sold to French television station XXL. Subject matter of their programs include cinema, travel (including gay tourism) and nightlife. A number of their television shows also feature the sex industry.

Productions

In French and English 
Box-office
Écrans du monde (Screens)
Gros plan sur… (Spotlight On…)
Il a dit, Elle a dit (He Said, She Said)
Colour Travel Series
Blue: "the world’s most beautiful beaches"
Grey: "the trendiest and most avant-garde cities"
Green: "uncovering the natural beauties of our planet"
Pink: "the hottest gay vacations"
White: "the world’s most beautiful mountains"
Yellow: "exploring the world’s deserts"
Red: "the nightlife - why some cities never sleep"
Culture du X (XXX Culture)
Hot-parade

Others 
La Vie rurale (adaptation of the American The Simple Life)
Bimbo, fantasmes et réalité
La Job (adaptation of the British The Office)
Culture de Stars
iCulture
BO2
Le Cinéjournal
Des gens pas ordinaires (adaptation of the American The Surreal Life)
3,2,1… Action !
Sex-shop Extrême
Sexe @...
Sex-shop
seXstar

See also 
List of Quebec television series
Television of Quebec
Culture of Quebec

External links 
IDI official site
Anne-Marie Losique official site
IDI Quebec adaptation of The Simple Life with Anne-Marie Losique at Sympatico.msn.com
List of IDI productions broadcast via CHUM Television, with descriptions
"Sex mogul" at The Montreal Mirror

Television production companies of Canada
Magazine publishing companies of Canada
Companies based in Montreal
Film production companies of Canada